Sir Hallewell Rogers, DL (25 February 1864 – 16 November 1931) was a British Conservative politician who was Member of Parliament and Lord Mayor of Birmingham.

Rogers was elected Lord Mayor of Birmingham in November 1902, serving two consecutive terms until November 1904. He stood for the Liberal Unionist Party, a Liberal breakaway faction led by fellow Brummie Joseph Chamberlain. The party in 1912 merged with the Conservative party, for which Rogers later entered parliament.

He was appointed Honorary Colonel of the 3rd South Midland Brigade, Royal Field Artillery, in 1913.

Rogers was elected member of parliament for Birmingham Moseley at the 1918 General Election. He resigned in 1920, precipitating a by-election in March 1921.

In 1925, he was appointed a deputy lieutenant for Warwickshire.

References

External links 
 

1864 births
1931 deaths
Conservative Party (UK) MPs for English constituencies
Deputy Lieutenants of Warwickshire
Knights Bachelor
UK MPs 1918–1922
Lord Mayors of Birmingham, West Midlands
Royal Field Artillery officers